Guy Webster is a Brisbane singer/songwriter. He is a member of Broken Head, The Informants and Guy Webster and Friends and released his solo self-titled debut EP in 2002. To promote the EP he went on a national tour with George. In 2003, Webster worked with poet Doug Thomson to release an EP, Seahorse.

Discography
Guy Webster (2002)

References

Australian guitarists
Australian singer-songwriters
Living people
People from Brisbane
Year of birth missing (living people)